Genesis 1:3 is the third verse of the first chapter in the Book of Genesis. In it God made light by declaration: God said, 'Let there be light,' and there was light. It is a part of the Torah portion known as Bereshit (Genesis 1:1-6:8).

"Let there be light" (like "in the beginning" in Genesis 1:1) has entered into common usage as a phrase. It is the motto (sometimes in its Latin form, fiat lux) for many educational institutions (using light as a metaphor for knowledge). The University of California is one example. The phrase also forms the chorus of John Marriott's hymn about Creation, "Thou, Whose Almighty Word."

Interpretations

By a word
Augustine of Hippo, in his City of God, sees the verse as indicating "not only that God had made the world, but also that He had made it by the word." The words "let there be light" are the first divine words in the Bible. The Latin for "let there be light" is "fiat lux," and this description of creation by command has led to the theological phrase "creation by fiat." In the words of Peter Kreeft, God "simply spoke... and it came to be."

Gerhard von Rad considers the implication to be "the most radical distinction between Creator and creature. Creation cannot be even remotely considered an emanation from God; it is not somehow an overflow or reflection of his being, i.e., of his divine nature, but is rather a product of his personal will."

The divine "fiat lux" in this passage has "exerted a powerful influence on the English poetic tradition." The many examples include John Dryden's lines "Thus Britain's Basis on a Word is laid, / As by a word the World itself was made."

Light
St Basil emphasises the role of light in making the universe beautiful, as does St Ambrose, who writes: "But the good Author uttered the word 'light' so that He might reveal the world by infusing brightness therein and thus make its aspect beautiful."

The light is described as being created here before the sun, moon, and stars, which appear on the fourth day. In some Jewish interpretations, the light created here is a primordial light, different in nature from (and brighter than) that associated with the sun. The light has also been interpreted metaphorically, and has been connected to Psalm 104 (a "poem of creation"), where God is described as wrapping himself in light.

Some writers have seen a connection between this verse and the Big Bang in physical cosmology.

Text
Various translations into English of the Hebrew text  (Wayyōmer Ělōhîm "yǝhî ôr," wayǝhî ôr) include:

See also

 "Let there be light"
 Enlightenment (spiritual)

References

Hebrew Bible verses
Genesis 1:3
Bereshit (parashah)
Light and religion